Geylang East Constituency was a constituency in Singapore. It used to exist from 1959 to 1980.

Member of Parliament

Elections

Elections in 1950s

References

Singaporean electoral divisions
Geylang